Salsta Castle is a country house in Sweden, situated north of Vattholma, Uppsala Municipality, approximately 25 kilometers north of Uppsala. A fortified castle was already present on the site in the late 13th century, and the estate has belonged to some of the most influential noble families in Sweden, notably Oxenstierna, Bielke and Brahe. The present baroque palace was erected in the French Baroque style in the 1670s for Nils Bielke the Younger, 1st Count Bielke af Åkerö and Imperial Count of Torgelow, incorporating elements from an earlier Renaissance castle, and designed and constructed by Mathias Spieler after an earlier design by Nicodemus Tessin the Elder.

See also
List of castles in Sweden

Castles in Uppsala County
Uppsala Municipality